Skyyport  is the third  album  by New York City based  group Skyy released in 1980  on  Salsoul Records.

Track listing

Personnel
Randy Muller - Flute, Keyboards, Percussion
Solomon Roberts, Jr. - Drums, Guitar, Vocals
Gerald Lebon - Bass
Tommy McConnell - Drums
Anibal "Butch" Sierra - Guitar
Larry Greenberg - Keyboards
Bonny Dunning, Delores Dunning Milligan, Denise Dunning Crawford - Vocals

Charts

Weekly charts

Year-end charts

Singles

References

External links
 Skyy-Skyyport  at Discogs

1980 albums
Skyy (band) albums
Salsoul Records albums